Cem Uzan (born 26 December 1960, İstanbul) is a Turkish businessman and politician involved in the media and banking industries, while also chairing the social liberal Young Party (GP). His family's media empire (Uzan Group) at one time included both television stations and print media. His family was one of Turkey's most influential families. His supporters claim Uzan's political rivalry resulted in the group's companies being seized by the government under Prime Minister Recep Tayyip Erdoğan, eventually resulting in Uzan's flight to France to escape what he claimed was political persecution. He has been sentenced in absentia to jail terms in the UK, USA and Turkey for fraud-related offences.

This followed closely on the heels of his conviction in the United States for fraud and came as the case was being put together in Turkey for racketeering and fraud leading many to believe he was escaping a likely conviction and prison term in Turkey. He was granted political asylum in Paris after the French government granted his request 

Uzan attempted to buy three units of Trump World Tower, but he ultimately defaulted on the contract and lost an $8 million deposit.

Cem Uzan announced his intention to run for president in 2023 Turkish presidential election.

Criticism
Uzan has often been criticized for using his professional life to bolster his political life, and even benefiting from criminal charges leveled against him. In 2003, U.S. District Court Judge Jed Rakoff commented, "I think the proof is very strong that the Uzans are business imperialists of the worst kind, in that they will go to any lengths, including fraud and racketeering, to preserve their business empire..." Cem Uzan responded by asserting that the judge "is biased against Turkey, against the Turkish people."

Fraud and convictions
In December 2002, a U.K. court sentenced Cem Uzan to 15 months imprisonment for contempt of court after he failed to appear in the U.K. to testify in a case involving a $4.3billion defrauding of Motorola corporation.

In 2009, Motorola and Nokia won a $4.8 billion judgement against the Uzan family. The Uzans failed to show up in court and the judge ordered an arrest warrant for them should they enter the United States. In 2009, he fled to France claiming political asylum. The request was granted by the French government. He was later indicted of racketeering in Turkey.

After his flight to France, Uzan was sentenced in absentia in Turkey to twenty-three years in prison on 15 April 2010.

References

1960 births
Living people
People from Adapazarı
Turkish political party founders
Leaders of political parties in Turkey
Deutsche Schule Istanbul alumni
Young Party politicians
Turkish newspaper publishers (people)
Turkish mass media owners
Turkish expatriates in France
Turkish people of Bosniak descent
20th-century Turkish businesspeople